This is a list of governors for Kalmar County of Sweden, from 1634 to present.

Footnotes

References

Kalmar